A Daughter of the Seine: The Life of Madame Roland is a biography written for children by Jeanette Eaton. It recounts the life story of Marie-Jeanne Roland de la Platière, an influential figure in the French Revolution. Born in relative obscurity, she became a prominent Girondist and was executed in one of Robespierre's purges. The biography was first published in 1929 and was a Newbery Honor recipient in 1930.

References

1929 children's books
American children's books
American biographies
French biographies
Newbery Honor-winning works
Books about the French Revolution
Children's history books